Tomorrow is Alright is a 2009 album by American band Sonny & The Sunsets.

Track listing
 "Too Young to Burn"
 "Death Cream"
 "Strange Love"
 "Planet of Women"
 "The Houris"
 "Stranded"
 "Bad Vibes & Evil Thoughts"
 "Chapters"
 "Love Among Social Animals"
 "Lovin' on an Older Gal"

Personnel 
Sonny Smith
Kelley Stoltz
Tahlia harbour
Shayde Sartin
Raphi Gottesman
Heidi Alexander
Tim Cohen
John Dwyer
Andrew Gerhan - engineering, mixing
Chris Johanson - cover art

References

2009 albums